The Rover JET1  was a gas turbine car originally built in Solihull in 1949/1950 by the Rover Company, and modified to a more aerodynamic style in 1952. It held a world speed record for a gas turbine-powered car in 1952 with a speed of 152.691 mph. Rover won the Dewar Trophy in 1950 for this work, in recognition of its outstanding pioneering achievement. It was the first time this trophy had been awarded since 1929.

In March 1950, Rover showed the JET1 prototype, the first car powered with a gas turbine engine, to the public. JET1, an open two-seat tourer, had the engine positioned behind the seats, air intake grilles on either side of the car, and exhaust outlets on the top of the tail. After being shown in the United Kingdom and the United States in 1950, JET1 was further developed, and was subjected to speed trials on the Jabbeke highway in Belgium in June 1952, where it exceeded . JET1 is currently on display at the London Science Museum.

See also
 Rover-BRM

References

Cars powered by gas turbines
Rover vehicles